Malaba may refer to:
Malaba, Kenya, a town in Busia County, western Kenya, on the border with Uganda
Malaba, Uganda, a town in Tororo District, eastern Uganda on the border with Kenya 
Malaba, Ngounié, Gabon
Malaba, Nyanga, Gabon
Malaba, Cameroon, Cameroon
Malaba Village, Kezi, Zimbabwe

See aksi
Malabar (disambiguation)